Disphyma australe is a species of flowering plant in the family Aizoaceae and is endemic to New Zealand.

Taxonomy
New Zealand authorities recognise two subspecies of Disphyma australe:
 Disphyma australe (W.T.Aiton) N.E.Br. subsp. australe that mostly grows on clif faces, rock stacks and beaches, rarely in marshes and estuaries and occurs on the Three Kings, North Island, South Island, Stewart and Chatham Islands;

 Disphyma australe subsp. stricticaule Chinnock that is endemic to the Kermadec Islands where it grows on cliff faces, beaches and near bird nesting grounds.

References

Aizoaceae
Flora of New Zealand